An Expressive Theory of Punishment is a 2016 book by Bill Wringe, in which the author tries to develop and argue for what he refers to as a "denunciatory theory" of punishment.

References

External links 
 An Expressive Theory of Punishment

2016 non-fiction books
Ethics books
Works about punishment
Palgrave Macmillan books